Madhuca korthalsii is a tree in the family Sapotaceae. It is named for the Dutch botanist P. W. Korthals.

Description
The bark is brown. Inflorescences bear up to five white flowers.

Distribution and habitat
Madhuca korthalsii is native to Sumatra, Peninsular Malaysia, Singapore and Borneo. Its habitat is lowland mixed dipterocarp forest to  altitude.

Conservation
Madhuca korthalsii has been assessed as near threatened on the IUCN Red List. The species is threatened by logging and conversion of land for palm oil plantations.

References

korthalsii
Trees of Sumatra
Trees of Malaya
Trees of Borneo
Plants described in 1885
Taxa named by William Burck